Jules-Édouard Prévost (21 November 1871 – 13 October 1943) was a Laurier Liberal and Liberal party member of the House of Commons of Canada. He was born in Saint-Jérôme, Quebec and became a journalist and publisher.

Prévost attended Collège Saint-Suplice in Montreal then studied further in Paris and Rome. He was a director of the newspaper l'Avenir du Nord. In 1910, he became a member of Quebec's Council of Public Instruction and from 1914 to 1916 was president of the French Aid Society for Terrebonne County.

He was first elected to Parliament at the Terrebonne riding under the Laurier Liberals in the 1917 general election. After this, he was re-elected as a Liberal in 1921, 1925 and 1926.

During his term in the 16th Canadian Parliament, Prévost was appointed to the Senate on 3 June 1930 and remained in that role until his death on 13 October 1943.

Electoral record

References

External links
 
 

1871 births
1943 deaths
Canadian senators from Quebec
Members of the House of Commons of Canada from Quebec
Laurier Liberals
Liberal Party of Canada MPs
People from Saint-Jérôme